Lachiguiri Zapotec (Northwestern Tehuantepec Zapotec, Zapoteco de Santiago Lachiguiri) is a Zapotecan language of the isthmus of Mexico.

References

Zapotec languages